Fanelli Cafe is a historic New York City restaurant and bar considered the city's second-oldest food-and-drink establishment in the same locale, having operated under various owners at 94 Prince Street since 1847. It served as a gathering place for artists during the transition of Manhattan's SoHo neighborhood from a manufacturing area to an arts community.

History
Erected in 1847, the retail site at 94 Prince Street, in the SoHo neighborhood of New York City's Manhattan borough, operated as a grocery store from that year to 1863. It then became a saloon for two years before becoming again a grocery for a year, and reverting to a saloon in 1867. Various owners followed, with Harry Green operating it as the Prince Cafe from 1905 to 1922. That year, Michael Fanelli purchased the business and rechristened it Fanelli Cafe. In 1982, his family sold it to Hans Noe, who continued it under that business name. Years later, Noe in turn passed it on to his son, Sasha.

The establishment operated as a speakeasy during Prohibition, which lasted from 1920 to 1933.

It did not become a tavern until 1863, but through its grocery roots is considered New York City's second-oldest food-and-drink establishment in the same locale, predated only by the Bridge Cafe (1794). In that respect, according to historian Richard McDermot, the site's continuous operation since 1847 predates those of Pete's Tavern (1851) and McSorley's Old Ale House (1862).

Artists' agora
Along with the restaurants Food, Cafe Rienzi, the O.G. Dining Room and the Spring Street Bar, Fanelli Cafe was among the gathering places for the artist community that settled in Manhattan's SoHo neighborhood from the Beat Generation era to the 1980s, between the neighborhood's times as a manufacturing center and an upscale shopping district. "Whatever work went on in the local studios was fueled by conversations that took place, and partnerships that formed, around these communal tables during the day and in neighborhood kitchens, bars and bedrooms after dark."

Artist Chuck Close was a habitué, as were boxing champion Rocky Graziano and singer-songwriter Bob Dylan. Close biographer Christopher Finch wrote:

References

External links
</ref>

1847 establishments in New York (state)
1922 establishments in New York City
Commercial buildings completed in 1847
Culture of New York City
Drinking establishments in Manhattan
Restaurants in Manhattan
SoHo, Manhattan